Forest Hill railway station serves Forest Hill in the London Borough of Lewisham, south London. The station adjoins a road which serves as part of the A205 South Circular Road.

The station is managed by London Overground, with Overground and Southern trains serving the station. Thameslink services also pass through the station. There are four tracks through the station, although only the slow lines (the two outer tracks) have platforms.

There are two entrances, the main one being on platform 1 at the bottom of the South Circular Road, and a side entrance on platform 2 on Perry Vale. The ticket office is placed in the main entrance, although there are ticket machines outside both entrances.

History
The station was opened by the original London & Croydon Railway (L&CR) on 5 June 1839, as Dartmouth Arms (the name of the local inn).

The line was also used by the London and Brighton Railway from 1841 and the South Eastern Railway (SER) from 1842. In 1844, the station was chosen by the L&CR as the northern terminus for Phase 1 of an experimental atmospheric railway to West Croydon. A pumping station was also constructed at the station. The L&CR and the L&BR merged to form the London Brighton and South Coast Railway (LB&SCR) in July 1846; the following year "atmospheric" working was abandoned. In 1845 the station became Forest Hill for Lordship Lane.

The LB&SCR moved the Down platform during the early 1850s when the line was quadrupled, and extended the island platform around 1864.

The LB&SCR station buildings were badly damaged by bombing during World War II but were patched up and survived until British Rail demolished them in 1972 and built a much smaller CLASP system-built prefabricated station building that remains in use to this day. The short narrow island platform serving the fast lines was demolished in the early 1960s.

Services

Services at Forest Hill are operated by Southern and London Overground using  and  EMUs.

The typical off-peak service in trains per hour is:
 2 tph to 
 8 tph to  via 
 2 tph to  via 
 4 tph to 
 4 tph to 

Connections
London Buses routes 122, 176, 185, 197 and 356 serve the station.

References

External links

Railway stations in the London Borough of Lewisham
Former London, Brighton and South Coast Railway stations
Railway stations in Great Britain opened in 1839
Railway stations served by London Overground
Railway stations served by Govia Thameslink Railway